George Henry "Bulger" Lowe Jr. (June 21, 1895 – February 18, 1939) was an American football player, coach, and official. He played professionally as a tackle and end for five seasons with the Canton Bulldogs, Cleveland Indians, Providence Steam Roller, and Frankford Yellow Jackets of the National Football League (NFL) and the Boston Bulldogs of the first American Football League..

In 1909, Lowe started his football career as a 14-year-old, playing guard for Arlington High School.  He attended Fordham University and was a captain of the 1917 Fordham Maroon football team.

Lowe served with the United States Army Ambulance Service in France during in World War I. He was wounded and hospitalized in France.

Lowe was the first player from Fordham to play professional football, when in 1920 he was drafted to play for Frankford.

Lowe officiated college football games during the 1930s. He died on February 18, 1939, following five weeks of illness.

The Gridiron Club of Greater Boston established  in 1939 to recognise New England's best offensive and defensive players in the NCAA Bowl and Championship divisions. The award is the third oldest collegiate football award in the United States, following the Heisman and Maxwell trophies.

References

External links
 
 

1895 births
1939 deaths
American football ends
American football tackles
College football officials
Fordham Rams football players
Boston Bulldogs (AFL) players
Boston College Eagles football coaches
Canton Bulldogs players
Cleveland Indians (NFL) players
Dartmouth Big Green football coaches
Frankford Yellow Jackets players
Lafayette Leopards football players
Providence Steam Roller players
Phillips Exeter Academy alumni
People from Arlington, Massachusetts
Sportspeople from Middlesex County, Massachusetts
Coaches of American football from Massachusetts
Players of American football from Massachusetts